Native ice cream may refer to:
 Indian ice cream (Alaska) of Alaskan Athabaskans
 akutaq or Eskimo ice cream